Đắk Lắk (or Daklak; , formerly Darlac) is a province of Vietnam. It is located in Vietnam's Central Highlands, and is home to quite a few indigenous ethnic minorities, such as the Rade, the Jarai and the Mnong, among others.

Etymology
The name comes from the Mnong (a Mon-Khmer language) word dak Lak (which would sound rather like "Đác Lác" in Vietnamese), literally "Lak Lake", the largest freshwater lake in the province. The word dak means "water" or "lake", and is a cognate of the Vietnamese nước/nác ("water"). The official spelling in Vietnamese is Đắk Lắk, despite the fact that the original Mnong word contains long "a" sounds rather than short "ă" sounds. Some other spellings such as Dak Lak, Daklak, Đăk Lăk, Đắc Lắc, and Darlac (in older French texts), among others, have also been used. The Daklak Guest House, for example, inconsistently uses Daklak and Đắk Lắk. Linguist Nguyễn Minh Hoạt has argued that a sensible spelling would be Dak Lăk, based on the ground that lak means dermatophytosis in Rade (an unrelated language of the Austronesian family), while at the same time citing the Mnong origin as the basis for the dak part of the spelling. The derivative Đắk Nông province appears to have been named after this province, by replacing Lắk with Nông for "Mnong".

History
The area now known as Đắk Lắk was originally controlled by the Kingdom of Champa. When Champa was conquered and annexed by Vietnam in the 15th century, Đắk Lắk was brought under loose Vietnamese rule. Later, in 1540, a noble named Bùi Tá Hán was appointed by the Vietnamese authorities to direct the settlement of the area by ethnic Vietnamese, bringing the highlands under more effective Vietnamese control. Military outposts were established in the area to guard against possible aggression from the west. Later, when Vietnam was occupied by the French, the French established a large number of plantations in the area. Resistance to French rule was strong in Đắk Lắk, with various minority tribes leading a number of significant rebellions. The most notable was a 23-year campaign led by N’Trang Lơng, a M’Nông tribal leader. Later, Đắk Lắk was part of South Vietnam, and saw considerable action in the Vietnam War.

Until recently, Đắk Nông was a part of Đắk Lắk, but is now a separate Province.

A chronology of key events

End of the 19th century: Đắk Lắk belonged to Kon Tum, part of Vietnam
22 November 1904: Đắk Lắk province was created and administrated by Annam
9 February 1913: Đắk Lắk province again part of Kon Tum
2 July 1923: a new Đắk Lắk was formed. It only had villages.
1931: it consisted of 5 provinces: Buôn Ma Thuột, Buôn Hồ, Đắk Song, Lak, M'Đrăk
2 July 1958: Đắk Lắk (Darlac) is composed of Buôn Ma Thuột, Lạc Thiện, M'Đrăk, Đắk Song, Buôn Hồ
23 January 1959: Quảng Đức province was created with the separation of Đăk Song. Part of M'Đrăk district was added to Khánh Hòa Province
20 December 1963: Phước An District was formed, with the capital at Phước Trạch, then later to Thuận Hiếu on 1 September 1965.
1976: new Đắk Lắk was formed from Đắk Lắk and Quảng Đức.
26 November 2003: Đắk Lắk was dissolved again into Đắk Lắk and Đắk Nông.

Geography 
Đắk Lắk is based around the Đắk Lắk Plateau, around six hundred metres above sea level.

About 60 km south of Buôn Ma Thuột is Lak Lake. Overlooking the lake is the old summer residence of Emperor Bảo Đại which has been renovated into a hotel. Surrounding the lake is Jun Village, home of the Jun people. The villagers have a peculiar form of fishing where they attach metal rods to a car battery and run the rods through the water, zapping and stunning the fish, and then collecting them to keep in a tank at the village until they are needed.

Administrative divisions
Đắk Lắk is subdivided into 15 district-level sub-divisions:

They are further subdivided into 12 commune-level towns (or townlets), 152 communes, and 20 wards.

Economy

Coffee, fruit, and rubber play an important part in its economy. Recently, there have been efforts to harness the province's considerable potential for hydroelectric generation.
The Jun people take advantage of the small tourist trade that passes through, giving elephant rides through the village and across the lake.

References

External links
Official website

 
Provinces of Vietnam